Swiss Uruguayans are Uruguayan citizens of full or partial Swiss ancestry, who remain culturally connected to Switzerland, or Swiss-born people permanently residing in Uruguay. They are estimated to be around 60,000.

History
In 1860, the Basel bank of Siegrist und Fender purchased farm land in Uruguay. It was not long before the first Swiss citizens moved to Uruguay with the goal of working the land as farmers, where they founded the colony of Nueva Helvecia around 1862.

As of 2008, there were 956 people with Swiss passports residing in Uruguay.

Notable Swiss Uruguayans
Past
José Belloni (1882–1965), sculptor
Roque Gastón Máspoli (1917–2004), football player and coach
Juan José Morosoli (1899-1959), writer
Bernardo Poncini (1814-1874), architect
Present
Julián Schweizer (born 1998), surfer
Matías Vitkieviez (born 1985), footballer
Walter Zimmer (born 1945), physician and politician

See also
Nueva Helvecia
Switzerland–Uruguay relations

Bibliography

References

External links
  

Uruguay
Ethnic groups in Uruguay
Immigration to Uruguay
Swiss immigration to Uruguay
Switzerland–Uruguay relations
European Uruguayan